Cornetite is a phosphate of copper with hydroxyl, named after the geologist .  It was discovered in 1917.

Type Locality 

Cornetite is most notably found in the Star of Congo mine, near Lubumbashi.

Environment 

Cornetite is a rare secondary mineral in some hydrothermal copper deposits.

Structure 

Unlike related phases such as Pseudomalachite, the copper atoms are all five-fold coordinated by oxygen. There are three unique copper sites that are all quite distorted from ideal symmetry. Two are in approximate tetragonal pyramids and the third is essentially a trigonal bipyramidal coordination. Edge sharing polyhedra lead to copper-copper dimer formation, and the overall structure is a three-dimensional network of copper-oxygen polyhedra.

References 

Phosphate minerals
Copper(II) minerals
Orthorhombic minerals
Minerals in space group 61